Cascadel (Mono: hoojowih ) is a former settlement in Madera County, California.

It was originally the Native American Mono village of Hoojowih. A post office operated at Cascadel from 1892 to 1896.

References

Mono tribe
Former Native American populated places in the Sierra Nevada (United States)
Former settlements in Madera County, California
Former populated places in California